is a junction passenger railway station in the city of Narashino, Chiba Prefecture, Japan, operated by the private railway operator Keisei Electric Railway.

Lines 
Keisei Tsudanuma Station is served by the following lines.
 Keisei Main Line
 Keisei Chiba Line
 Shin-Keisei Line
It is located 29.7 km from the Tokyo terminus of the Keisei Main Line at Keisei Ueno Station, and 26.5 km from the terminus of the Shin-Keisei Line at Matsudo Station. Keisei Tsudanuma also forms the terminus of the Keisei Chiba Line.

Station layout 
The station consists of three island platforms with an elevated station building.

Platforms

History 
It was renamed Keisei Tsudanuma on 18 November 1931. From 1 November 1953, the Shin-Keisei Electric Railway began operations to the station using the existing platforms, and from October 1957 to its own platform.

Station numbering was introduced to all Keisei Line stations on 17 July 2010; Keisei Tsudanuma Station was assigned station number KS26.

Passenger statistics
In fiscal 2019, the station was used by an average of 60,394 passengers daily.

Surrounding area
 Narashino City Office

See also
 List of railway stations in Japan

References

External links

 Keisei station layout 
 Shin-Keisei station information 

Railway stations in Japan opened in 1921
Railway stations in Chiba Prefecture
Keisei Main Line
Narashino